Fiennes Neil Wykeham Cornwallis, 3rd Baron Cornwallis, OBE, DL (29 June 1921 – 6 March 2010) was a British peer. He was the younger child, and the only son, of Wykeham Cornwallis, 2nd Baron Cornwallis and Cecily Etha Mary (née Walker). He had an elder sister, Rosamond Patricia Susan Anne Cornwallis (15 May 1918 – 3 September 1960).

He attended Eton College. Upon the death of his father in 1982, he succeeded him as the 3rd Baron Cornwallis.

Family life
Lord Cornwallis married three times. His first wife was Judith Lacy (née Scott), daughter of Lt.-Col. Geffrey Lacy Scott. They married on 17 October 1942 and were divorced in 1948. They had two children:
Anne Judy Cornwallis (13 November 1943 – 26 June 1966), and Fiennes Wykeham Jeremy Cornwallis (b. 25 May 1946), the 4th Baron Cornwallis.

He married, secondly, Agnes Jean Russell (née Landale), daughter of Captain Henderson Russell Landale, on 1 June 1951 with whom he had four children: Patrick Wykeham David Cornwallis (b. 28 May 1952), Cecily Mary Clare McCulloch (b. 23 October 1954), Vanessa Rachel Middleton (b. 27 July 1958), and Susan Patricia Rose Crolla (née Cornwallis) (b. 30 March 1963). Lady Cornwallis died on 15 March 2001. Lord Cornwallis married, thirdly, Stephanie Coleman, on 6 April 2002. She died on 4 December 2009.

Other information
During World War II, Lord Cornwallis served with the Coldstream Guards between 1940 – 1944 when he was invalided out of the army. He was also a very senior Freemason, and served as Pro Grand Master of the United Grand Lodge of England from 1982 to 1992, having previously been Deputy Grand Master, and Pro First Grand Principal of the Supreme Grand Chapter of England and Wales from 1982 to 1992, having previously been Second Grand Principal.

He had been a stamp collector since his youth. His specialised collections of Australia, Gambia, Gibraltar, and Malta stamps were sold in 2011. He was a fellow of the Royal Philatelic Society London from 1988 and a member of the Royal Tunbridge Wells Philatelic Society.

Bibliography
Kidd, Charles; Williamson, David (editors). Debrett's Peerage and Baronetage (1990 edition). New York: St Martin's Press, 1990.

References

External links

The Descendants of William the Conqueror Page 104
Lippincott's Magazine of Popular Literature and Science The Cornwallis Family

1921 births
2010 deaths
People educated at Eton College
Coldstream Guards officers
British Army personnel of World War II
Deputy Lieutenants of Kent
Officers of the Order of the British Empire
British philatelists
Fellows of the Royal Philatelic Society London
Fiennes
Barons Cornwallis
Cornwallis